Thallium(III) nitrate, also known as thallic nitrate, is a thallium compound with chemical formula Tl(NO3)3. It is normally found as the trihydrate. It is a colorless and highly toxic salt. It is a strong oxidizing agent useful in organic synthesis.  Among its many transformations, it oxidizes methoxyl phenols to quinone acetals, alkenes to acetals, and cyclic alkenes to ring-contracted aldehydes.

References

Nitrates
Thallium(III) compounds
Oxidizing agents
Reagents for organic chemistry